Darrius Barnes (born December 24, 1986) is a retired American soccer player.  He played the majority of his professional career for the New England Revolution of  Major League Soccer, the top flight of professional soccer in the United States.  He primarily played defender.

Career

Youth and College
Barnes played high school soccer at Southeast Raleigh High School, in Raleigh, North Carolina. He started for Varsity all four years. His senior year he helped his team to reach the conference finals and defeat a tough Broughton High School team to claim the school's first ever conference championship. His merits include TAAC All-Conference 2005.

Barnes played college soccer at Duke University. During his college years Barnes also played with Raleigh CASL Elite and Cary RailHawks U23's in the USL Premier Development League.

Professional
Barnes was drafted in the third round (40th overall) of the 2009 MLS SuperDraft by New England Revolution. He made his professional debut on 21 March 2009, in New England's first game of the 2009 MLS season against the San Jose Earthquakes.  He became the second rookie in the history of MLS to play every minute of every game, following in the footsteps of former Revs center back Michael Parkhurst, who was the first to accomplish the feat in 2005.

Following his release from New England at the end of the 2016 season, Barnes joined North American Soccer League side New York Cosmos on March 24, 2017.

On December 15, 2017, Barnes announced his retirement from playing professional soccer.

Post-playing career
After retiring from active play, Barnes joined the Major League Soccer offices and as of June, 2020 was working for the league in marketing.

References

External links
 

1986 births
Living people
African-American soccer players
American soccer players
Association football defenders
Cary Clarets players
Duke Blue Devils men's soccer players
Major League Soccer players
New England Revolution draft picks
New England Revolution players
New York Cosmos (2010) players
North American Soccer League players
North Carolina FC U23 players
Soccer players from North Carolina
Soccer players from Raleigh, North Carolina
USL League Two players